(born November 12, 1956, in Ōsaka) is a former Olympic gymnast for Japan at the 1984 Summer Olympics in Los Angeles, California, where he won a total number of five medals, including two gold. He broke an ankle in May 1985 which prevented him from training for 3 months and hindered his performances at the 1985 World Championships.  Gushiken announced his retirement at the 1985 Chūnichi Cup. He currently coaches other Olympic contenders.

References

 
 Competitive Results at gymn-forum.net
 Gushiken(Parallel bars Animation)

1956 births
Living people
Japanese male artistic gymnasts
Gymnasts at the 1984 Summer Olympics
Olympic gymnasts of Japan
Olympic gold medalists for Japan
Olympic silver medalists for Japan
Olympic bronze medalists for Japan
World champion gymnasts
Medalists at the World Artistic Gymnastics Championships
Nippon Sport Science University alumni
Place of birth missing (living people)
Olympic medalists in gymnastics
Asian Games medalists in gymnastics
Gymnasts at the 1982 Asian Games
Asian Games gold medalists for Japan
Asian Games silver medalists for Japan
Medalists at the 1982 Asian Games
Medalists at the 1984 Summer Olympics
Sportspeople from Osaka
20th-century Japanese people
21st-century Japanese people